Shaheen Academy School & College Feni is a secondary school in Feni District, Bangladesh. It located on the Shaheen Academy Road at Rampur in Feni town.  It is with the Board of Intermediate and Secondary Education, Comilla.

Uniform 
From classes 6 to 10 the uniform is a white shirt with full-length navy blue pants, white shoes and navy blue sweater (for winter only)and green and orange scarf for boys in scout style and for girls in orna style.. The school's monogram is printed on the shirt's pocket. The uniform of girls(6-10)is black burka and black hijab. The uniform of college is (boys)navy blue shirt and black pant. Girls is navy blue burka and white hijab.

History
The academy was established as Shaheen Academy Feni in 1985 as a private school in Feni town. Principal Md Mostafa  was the founding principal of the school. Other founders were Mokhbul Ahmed, Liakat Ali Bhuiyan, Khair Ahmed, Kefayet Ullah Bhuiyan, Hemayet Uddin. The academy is directed by the Islamic Education Society, Feni. Its first campus was situated at the S.S.K. Road, Feni. Now a campus has been built in Rampur.

There are 3500 students studying at the school.

References 

High schools in Bangladesh
Private schools in Bangladesh
1985 establishments in Bangladesh